Mahirap Maging Pogi is a 1992 Filipino comedy film written and directed by Ben Feleo. The film stars Andrew E., along with Dennis Padilla, Gelli de Belen, Ruby Rodriguez, Ogie Alcasid, Janno Gibbs, Anjo Yllana, Ana Roces, Lea Orosa, Mia Pratts, Almira Muhlach, Patrick Guzman, Michael de Mesa and Roi Vinzon. Named after Andrew E.'s rap song of the same name, the film was produced by Viva Films and released in August 19, 1992.

Critic Justino Dormiendo of the Manila Standard gave the film a negative review, criticizing it as "downright ugly" and "not much fun".

The film is streaming online on YouTube.

Cast
Andrew E. as Parding Pogi
Dennis Padilla as Dodong Boogie
Gelli de Belen as Gigi
Ruby Rodriguez as May
Ogie Alcasid as Dodie
Janno Gibbs as Siano
Anjo Yllana as Jojo
Ana Roces as Annie
Lea Orosa as Ms. Muñoz
Mia Pratts as Ingrid
Almira Muhlach as Mari
Patrick Guzman as Robert
Michael de Mesa as Gabby
Roi Vinzon as Richard
Jinky Oda as Yaya
Jessa Zaragoza as Jezebel
Jojo de Cresta as Joanne
Elizabeth Alvarez as Elizabeth Alvarez
Errol Dionisio as Joey Boy de Sastro

Former radio disc jockey and current GMA News personality Mike Enriquez appeared in the film as a cameo role.

Production
Filming took place from July 2 to 22, 1992.

Release
Mahirap Maging Pogi was released on August 19, 1992.

Critical response
Justino Dormiendo, writing for the Manila Standard, gave Mahirap Maging Pogi a negative review, criticizing it as "downright ugly" for its central ironic joke of Andrew E.'s character being seen as handsome even though he is not, and stated that "Ugliness is never a virtue especially if it is used to deceive the viewer." He also noted that the film is "not much fun and the gags are hardly original", citing its general use of toilet humor and a subplot which directly imitates the main storyline from Charlie Chaplin's 1931 film City Lights.

References

External links

Full Movie on Viva Films

1992 films
1992 comedy films
Filipino-language films
Philippine comedy films
Viva Films films
Films directed by Ben Feleo